Sadeqabad-e Lachari (also Romanized as Şādeqābād-e Lācharī and Şadeqābād-e Lāchrī; also known as Lācharī, Lācharī, Şadeqābād, and Şadeqābād) is a village in Bagh Safa Rural District, Sarchehan District, Bavanat County, Fars Province, Iran. At the 2006 census, its population was 62, in 13 families.

References 

Populated places in Sarchehan County